The Asociación Peruana de Cricket or Cricket Peru is the official governing body of the sport of cricket in Peru. Cricket Peru is Peru's representative at the International Cricket Council and is an associate member and has been a member of that body since 2007. It is included in the ICC Americas region.

Cricket has been played in Peru for over 150 years, at the splendid Lima Cricket & Football Club (LCFC), and is now undergoing resurgence as a recently admitted Affiliate Member of the International Cricket Council (ICC) and a founder member of Cricket South America (CSA), along with Argentina, Brazil and Chile.

Domestic Cricket

Peru traditionally held an 8- to 10-week season at the LCFC from February until Easter. Most of the fixtures were friendlies, and the most important regular matches on the calendar were traditionally the British Ambassador’s XI vs President of the LCFC XI and Asia vs Rest of the World. The latter is still hotly contested, while the former has been developed into a one-day cricket carnival, The Ambassador's Cup, featuring teams - and ambassadors - representing Australia, India, South Africa and UK.

The Easter holiday, which was traditionally a time for overseas touring teams to visit Lima, is now set aside for the South American Championship (SAC), a non-official, annual tournament between teams representing CSA members i.e. Argentina, Brazil, Chile & Peru, as well as invited national teams. 2014 saw the 11th staging of this tournament, with Lima hosting.

The advantage of playing cricket in Lima is that play is never lost to rain!

In November 2006, a uniquely Peruvian cricket form, Cricket Veloz, was introduced to the cricketing calendar, and the Cricket Veloz Trophy has been hotly contested every year since. Originally designed as a four-team, indoor tournament, in 2009 it was rebranded as an outdoor 6-a-side festival, with great success, fitting nicely into the 150th Anniversary celebrations of the LCFC.

National Twenty20 Championship

In 2007, the Peruvian National T20 Championship was inaugurated, with all games being played at LCFC.

The four founding teams were:
1) The Kiteflyers: the cricketing arm of a multinational local football team - with a British core - founded in 1981.

2) Eidgenossen: a team made up mainly of teachers from local British schools
Eidgenossenschaft is a German word meaning confederation. The term literally translates as "oath fellowship". An Eidgenossenschaft is a confederacy of equal partners, which can be individuals or groups such as states, formed by a pact sealed by a solemn oath. Such an alliance could be either time-limited or unlimited (or "eternal"). An important characteristic is that the partners were always considered equal, in contrast to the oath of fealty in feudal societies with their strict hierarchies. As a political term, it is used most often as a synonym for Switzerland, whose official German name is "Schweizerische Eidgenossenschaft", usually translated as Swiss Confederation. An Eidgenosse is a member of an Eidgenossenschaft, and is an expression for "Swiss citizen".

3) Chak De: a team made up of Peruvian residents from the Indian subcontinent. 
‘Chak De’ means ‘let’s go’ in Punjabi.

4) LCFC: members and invited players from the Lima Cricket and Football Club

Originally, the T20 Championship was played over three Sundays, with each team playing the others once. But with the success of the format, and the addition of a fifth team, Lima Indians in 2013, the competition has now been expanded into two stages - the Apertura and the Clausura - lasting for 10 weeks of the season. Accordingly, the start of the season has been moved forward to early January.

Tacna, in the south of Peru, in the late 1990s and early 2000s had a sizable Pakistani population, many of whom were involved in the importation of second-hand cars; and from this community they were able to create a team, the Tacna Tigers, which annually visited Lima to play cricket, and provided a number of players for the national side. However, changes to the free trade zone regulations governing business in Tacna, from 2011 onwards, saw the Pakistani cricket community dwindle in size.

International Cricket

Cricket Peru's men's team are known as the 'Llamas', and have competed in international competitions since 1997, usually against other Latin American national sides.

ICC Americas Division III

The Llamas competed three times in the ICC Americas Division III, an officially sanctioned ranking tournament, overseen by the International Cricket Council that offered a pathway to World League Cricket and potentially to playing in the World Cup.

1. Buenos Aires, Argentina: 12 – 16 Feb, 2008:

This was a 50-over tournament, played at different venues in Buenos Aires, featuring 5 teams - Belize, Brazil, Chile, Peru and Turks & Caicos Islands - that had a stunning climax with three teams in a position to win the tournament before the final ball of the tournament. The eventual winners were the Turks and Caicos Islands, who were promoted to Division II.

Second place went to Chile on account of their lower net run rate. Belize finished third.

Peru, captained by Harry Hildebrand, lost their first three games, but on the last day of the tournament, pulled off an upset by defeating Brazil, thereby securing fourth place, with Brazil in 5th.

2. Santiago, Chile: 9 - 12 Oct, 2009:

Again this was a 50-over tournament, played at Craighouse in Santiago, Chile, with only 4 teams: Belize, Brazil, Chile & Peru. The Llamas, under the captaincy of Miles Buesst, lost all their games to finish fourth, but came close to defeating eventual champions, Brazil, in their final match, falling 17 short chasing 253.

3. San Jose, Costa Rica: 14–18 March 2011

The format of this tournament was changed to T20, and featured 6 teams: Belize, Brazil, Chile, hosts Costa Rica, Falkland Islands and Peru, playing at Los Reyes Polo Club on the outskirts of San Jose. The shorter format suited the Llamas' style of play, and Peru, captained by Miles Buesst (and Mike Soulsby, for one match) enjoyed their most successful international tournament to date, with a record of four wins out of five, and a highly creditable 2nd-place finish. The only loss was to the eventual undefeated champions, Belize, on the first morning.

Success was based on a disciplined bowling unit of Miles Buesst, Nadeem Ahmed, Javed Iqbal, Tony Sanford and Dinesh Ekanayake, taking advantage of the low bounce of the wickets, and a large, slow outfield, backed up by good fielding, to starve batsmen of runs and force them into errors. Runs were at a premium on the two pitches used, and so batsmen had to be patient and correct to weather the initial storm of the opposition’s top bowlers, before making hay against the lesser bowlers. This approach was typified by Mike Soulsby’s masterly half century, off 63 balls, against Chile, that won him the Man of the Match award.

Seemingly low T20 scores of under a hundred against Chile and Costa Rica were easily defended, and even the free-scoring Belizean batsmen took 14 overs to score 65, losing 6 wickets along the way, and indicating that the ball would dominate the bat for most of the Championship.
This was certainly the case against Mexico, who batting first, were rolled over for 49; and then the Falkland Islands were dismissed for 22, the lowest score of the tournament, as some of Peru’s second-string bowlers came to the fore.

South American Championship

Sadly, in 2012, ICC policy changed, with the focus shifting away from High Performance Cricket to increasing Participation Numbers. This decision was driven by an economic imperative.

The ramifications for Cricket Peru were that there would no longer be any ICC-sponsored international cricket. Solace could be found in the fact that the Llamas had been participating in the bi-annual South American Championships (SAC) since 1995.

In the wake of the ICC decision to scrap the ICC Americas Div III tournament, it was decided to make the SAC an annual T20 Easter championship, with the hosting rotating between the four members of Cricket South America.

In April 2014, it was the turn of Cricket Peru to host SAC XI. For the first time, Mexico were invited to join the tournament, which they did with great enthusiasm - so much so that they actually won the tournament, defeating Chile in the final, thereby taking the trophy out of South America for the first time!

Chile had won three games out of four leading up to the Final, but Brazil, Mexico and Peru had all won two games each; and so qualification to face Chile came down to wickets lost.

Central American Championship

After the success of the expanded 2014 South American Championships in Lima, Cricket Panama were inspired to invite additional teams to their March 2015 Central American Championship (CAC) in Panama City. The invitees that accepted were Peru, Brazil and M.C.C, who took their place alongside regulars Mexico, Costa Rica, El Salvador and, of course, Panama.

Another of the CAC regulars, Belize, pulled out at the eleventh hour, and their place was taken by a Panama A side, to keep the number of teams at eight, divided into two groups of four, playing T20 games.

The Llamas first match, on March 17, was against the M.C.C, who had just been on the wrong end of a hard-fought series in Suriname, and were in no mood to be generous. Featuring a number of County players and ex-players, they racked up an imposing 200 for 8 off their 20 overs. Peru, batting second, were never in the hunt and faltered to 79, for a chastening loss.

The next game was against old sparring partners, Brazil, on March 18. Again Peru bowled first and did well to keep the Brazil score down to 141 for 8. The reply started well, with Hallett, Soulsby and Myers all making quick runs, but after a mid-innings stutter, the run rate started to climb alarmingly. Some good late innings clubbing, and hard running, from man-of-the-match Buesst (35*) and Chaplin (5*), saw Peru home with 3 balls to spare, for a famous 5-wicket victory.

The last group game was against Panama A on the morning of March 19. Batting first, Peru racked up 147 for 9 off their 20 overs, with Soulsby (39), Buesst (35) and Myers (29) the main contributors. In a mirror image of the game the day before, the Panama A reply got off to a fast start and then faltered in the middle overs, as they lost wickets and the run rate increased. However, they got over the line with 3 balls to spare, and 5 wickets in hand, thanks to some good death batting.

The upshot of these group games was that Peru came third in the group, thereby missing out on progressing to the semi-final stage. They were able to take solace in a victory, that afternoon, over Costa Rica, who had come also third in their group, to claim 5th place. Drained from the morning's narrow loss, Peru's batsman struggled to a total of 109 for 8 from their 20 overs, with Soulsby and Myers again in the runs. However, the bowlers, led by Spry (3 for 12) and Roughton (3 for 14) and backed up by some good fielding, did enough to keep the Costa Rica batting line-up down to a total of 91 all out.

This was a satisfying end to an excellent tournament, with two wins and two losses.

Amistad Cup

The development of cricket in Peru and Brazil has followed quite similar trajectories since their acceptance as Affiliate Members of the ICC in the early 2000s, with a small group of keen volunteers facing sizable geographical and cultural challenges. This has led to a close friendship off the pitch - with the sharing of ideas and resources - and a healthy rivalry on the pitch.

To encapsulate this relationship, in 2011 it was decided to inaugurate the Amistad Cup (actually a Thermos flask), which would be awarded to the winner of any men's cricket game between Peru and Brazil. The loser would be given the dubious prize of The Spork (half spoon, half fork), which was found as a hidden extra in the lid of the Thermos!

Brazil is the current holder of the Amistad Cup, having defeated Peru in the group stage of the 2015 South American Championship in Chile.

References

External links
 Cricket in Peru article

Cricket administration
Cricket in Peru
Sports governing bodies in Peru